Malika Bilal, is a broadcast journalist, currently working for Al Jazeera English.

Malika is the host of the Al Jazeera Podcast The Take. Previously she was co-host and digital producer of The Stream, based at the Al Jazeera English US broadcast-center, in Washington, DC.

She joined the DC bureau from the channel's main broadcast-center in Doha, in Qatar, where she worked as an editor and writer for the Al Jazeera English website.

Personal life
Born and raised in Chicago, Illinois, she self-professedly grew up listening to All Things Considered and Morning Edition on NPR during the long car rides to and from school with her parents.

Malika graduated from Northwestern University in Evanston, Illinois, where she studied journalism. She also attended the American University in Cairo to develop her knowledge of Arabic.

Career
Malika began her career as a TV broadcaster on her campus station, but also wrote for magazines. She was then a daily reporter on a Tribune Company newspaper [which?] and, in 2006, also worked for Voice of America.

Al Jazeera English
Malika joined Al Jazeera English in February 2009 and became the co-host of the award-winning program, The Stream in 2012.

References

External links

 Malika Bilal - Facebook,
 Malika Bilal - Google+
 Malika Bilal - Al Jazeera Blogs,
 NPR's Intern Edition Summer 2005.

Living people
Al Jazeera people
Television personalities from Chicago
Year of birth missing (living people)